Cardinal Tien Hospital Ankang Branch (Chinese: 耕莘安康院區站; Pinyin: Gēngshēn ānkāng yuànqū zhàn) is a light rail station of the Ankeng light rail, operated by the New Taipei Metro, in Xindian, New Taipei, Taiwan.

Station overview
The station is an at-grade station with 2 side platforms. It is located on Section 2, Anyi Road, near Chezi Road.

Station layout

Around the station

 Cardinal Tien Hospital Ankang Branch

Bus connections
Buses 839, G7, and G15 stop at this station.

History
Construction of the station began on November 7, 2014 and finished in 2022, and the station opened on February 10, 2023.

See also

 Ankeng light rail
 New Taipei Metro
 Rail transport in Taiwan

References

External links
New Taipei Metro Corporation

New Taipei City Department of Rapid Transit

Ankeng light rail stations